Milligram was an American rock band from Boston active from 1996 until 2002.

Biography
Formed by Jonah Jenkins and Darryl Shepard in 1996, Milligram had no permanent drummer. Shepard continued playing in Roadsaw, while Jenkins formed Miltown. After a predictably "major" label battle between Miltown and Warner Brothers/Giant Records, Jenkins returned to Milligram in 1998. After recruiting Bob Maloney on bass guitar and Zephan Courtney (StompBox, Juliana Hatfield, Chevy Heston) on drums, the Hello Motherfucker! EP CD/EP was recorded.

In late 1999, Milligram parted ways with Bob Maloney and recruited Jeff Turlik (Blue Man Group, StompBox, Roadsaw) on bass guitar. The Hello Motherfucker! EP CD/EP was released on April 28, 2000, on Tortuga Recordings. On March 20, 2001, the Hello Motherfucker! CD/EP was re-released with a bonus companion CD : Black & White Rainbow. Their next release, which was originally titled Death To America, was scheduled to be recorded starting on September 11, 2001, at the New Alliance Studios in Boston, but because of the 9/11 events, recording was pushed back to three days in November, 2001, with the final recording finished over three days in February, 2002. The release was also renamed This Is Class War. Fourteen songs from This Is Class War were originally released in a limited pressing of 300 hand-stamped CDRs on Jenkins's label, TRAKTOR7 Records.

The band broke up in summer 2002. Though they had disbanded only a few months earlier, the Milligram’s final sessions were taken up by Small Stone Records and released on February 25, 2003, with more than 30 minutes of bonus material such as outtakes or remixes (drums and voices only).

In 2011, Milligram reformed to play at the Palladium with Kyuss Lives in Worcester, Massachusettes.

Band members
 Jonah Jenkins - vocals
 Darryl Shepard - guitar, piano
 Zephan "Zeph" Courtney - drums
 Bob Maloney (1996-1999) - bass guitar
 Jeff Turlik (1999-2002) - bass guitar

Discography

EPs

7" vinyl
1999

2002

Compilation appearances
2001
 Music With Attitude: Volume 31
Have contributed with track "Not Okay" - 4:01
2002
 Sucking the 70s
Have contributed with track "Rumblin' Man" a cover song of the band Cactus - 3:47

External links
Milligram on Small Stone Records
Milligram on The Boston Phoenix
Milligram on Spirit Of Metal
Milligram on Allmusic.com
Milligram on Encyclopaedia Metallum
Milligram on Cosmiclava.com
Interview with Jonah Jenkins at Deaf Sparrow
Jonah Jenkins interview at Asice.net
Jonah Jenkins interviewed in the Boston Phoenix by James Parker, author of Turned On: A Biography of Henry Rollins
Milligram interview in The Boston Globe, 10/5/2012
Milligram interview in The Phoenix, 10/10/2012
Jeff Turlik interviewed on the Culture Trip website, as Creative Director of The Blue Man Group

Alternative rock groups from Massachusetts
American alternative metal musical groups
Hardcore punk groups from Massachusetts
Heavy metal musical groups from Massachusetts
American stoner rock musical groups